The 2011 FIVB Volleyball Men's Club World Championship was the 7th edition of the event. It was held in Doha, Qatar from 8 to 14 October 2011.

Qualification

Pools composition

Squads

Venue

Pool standing procedure
 Match points
 Number of matches won
 Sets ratio
 Points ratio
 Result of the last match between the tied teams

Match won 3–0 or 3–1: 3 match points for the winner, 0 match points for the loser
Match won 3–2: 2 match points for the winner, 1 match point for the loser

Preliminary round
All times are Arabia Standard Time (UTC+03:00).

Pool A

|}

|}

Pool B

|}

|}

Final round
All times are Arabia Standard Time (UTC+03:00).

Semifinals

|}

3rd place match

|}

Final

|}

Final standing

Awards

Most Valuable Player
 Osmany Juantorena (Trentino Diatec)
Best Scorer
 Maxim Mikhaylov (Zenit Kazan)
Best Spiker
 Osmany Juantorena (Trentino Diatec)
Best Blocker
 Russell Holmes (Jastrzębski Węgiel)

Best Server
 Matey Kaziyski (Trentino Diatec)
Best Setter
 Raphael Oliveira (Trentino Diatec)
Best Receiver
 Sérgio Santos (SESI São Paulo)
Best Libero
 Sérgio Santos (SESI São Paulo)

External links
Official website
Final Standing
Awards

2011 FIVB Men's Club World Championship
FIVB Men's Club World Championship
FIVB Men's Club World Championship
FIVB Volleyball Men's Club World Championship
Sports competitions in Doha